The Miss Perú 1989 pageant was held on April 28, 1989. That year, 16 candidates were competing for the national crown. The chosen winner represented Peru at the Miss Universe 1989 and Miss World 1989.  The rest of the finalists would enter in different pageants.

Placements

Special Awards

 Best Regional Costume - Puno - Ana María Carrasco Palomo
 Miss Photogenic - Region Lima - Maritza Zorrilla
 Miss Elegance - Cuzco - Carmen Abad-Schuster
 Miss Body - Ancash - Macarena Leguía
 Best Hair - Distrito Capital – Mariana Sovero
 Miss Congeniality - Ucayali - Tessy Torres Palacios
 Most Beautiful Face - Amazonas - Ana Rosa Vick

.

Delegates

Amazonas - Ana Rosa Vick
Ancash - Macarena Leguía
Arequipa - Francoise Rodríguez
Cajamarca - Mariela Bisval
Callao - Ximena Fernald
Cuzco - Carmen Abad-Schuster
Distrito Capital - Mariana Sovero McKay
Ica - Patricia Burgos

La Libertad - Yvonne Vera
Lambayeque - Clara Luisa Reátegui Cipriani
Piura - Mariloli Pita
Puno - Ana María Carrasco Palomo
Region Lima - Maritza Zorrilla
Tacna - Gladys Rivera
Tumbes - Guiselle García
Ucayali - Tessy Torres Palacios

.

Background Music

Swimsuit Competition – Spyro Gyra — Soho Mojo
Evening Gown Competition – Orlando Netti -Te Voy A Contar Un Secreto

.

References 

Miss Peru
1989 in Peru
1989 beauty pageants